Gavin Beith (born 7 October 1981) is a Scottish football coach and former player, who played as a midfielder. He is currently co-manager of Scottish Women's Premier League team Aberdeen, having previously been head coach of the Dundee United women's team from 2015 to 2021. As a player, he began his career with Dundee, from where he was loaned to East Fife and Peterhead. He later played for Brechin City, Arbroath, East Fife again, Forfar Athletic and Carnoustie Panmure.

Early life
Beith was born in Dundee on 7 October 1981. He grew up supporting Dundee F.C. and lived in Fleming Gardens, close to their Dens Park ground. He left school at the age of 16 and signed for the club as a professional.

Playing career
During his youth career at Dundee, Beith played for the club in the Scottish Youth Cup final. He made a few first team appearances and spent time on loan to East Fife and Peterhead. In November 2003, Beith was one of the players whose contracts were cancelled when Dundee entered administration. He went on to have spells as a part-time footballer with Brechin City, Arbroath, East Fife, Forfar Athletic and junior club Carnoustie Panmure before retiring from playing in 2011.

Coaching career
Beith entered football coaching, obtaining UEFA B Licence and Scottish Football Association (SFA) Advanced Youth Licence qualifications. He began his coaching career at Arbroath, where he was appointed youth coach in 2009, before working as a Player and Coach Development Officer at the SFA East Region office in Dundee. In June 2015 he was appointed as the first head coach of Dundee United's newly formed women's team. During six years at the club, he won the Scottish Women's Football League (SWFL) Division 2 East and the SWFL Second Division Cup in his first season, then promotion from SWFL Division 1 North in 2018. He stepped down in July 2021, having narrowly missed out on promotion to the top flight of the Scottish Women's Premier League (SWPL) in the 2020–21 season. In September 2021 he joined Aberdeen Women, newly promoted to the top division of the SWPL, as joint co-manager alongside Emma Hunter. He has also assisted Pauline MacDonald with coaching the Scotland women's under-17 team.

Career statistics

References

External links

1981 births
Living people
Footballers from Dundee
Association football midfielders
Scottish footballers
Scottish football managers
Dundee F.C. players
East Fife F.C. players
Peterhead F.C. players
Brechin City F.C. players
Arbroath F.C. players
Forfar Athletic F.C. players
Carnoustie Panmure F.C. players
Scottish Premier League players
Scottish Football League players
Scottish Junior Football Association players
Dundee United W.F.C. managers
Scottish Women's Premier League managers
Aberdeen F.C. Women managers